Vicente Ferreira da Silva (January 10, 1916 – July 19, 1963) was a Brazilian logician, mathematician, and philosopher. He was one of first men in Brazil history to write and have published an academic book in logic and Phenomenology.

Biography 
First philosopher to study logic in Brazil, Vicente was an assistant to Willard Van Orman Quine.

In his mature work, he sought to develop a systematic foundational philosophy based on Heidegger's work and Schelling's philosophy of mythology. Based on the myths, Vicente founded a kind of neopaganism.

During his life, Vicente kept in touch and influenced thinkers like João Guimarães Rosa, Agostinho da Silva, Oswald de Andrade, Julian Marias, Miguel Reale, Saint-John Perse and Vilém Flusser, who said that Vicente was the only and greatest philosopher in the history of Brazil.

He died in 1963 in a car accident.

Partial bibliography
  Modern Logic  (1939)
  Elements of Mathematical Logic  (1940)
  Philosophical Essays  (1948)
  Exegesis of the Action  (1949 and 1954)
  Ideas for a New Concept of Man  (1951)
  Theology and Anti-Humanism  (1953)
  Instruments, Things and Culture  (1958)
  Dialectics of the Consciences  (1950)
  Dialectics of the Consciences - Complete Works  (2009)
  Symbolic Logic - Complete Works  (2009)
  Transcendence of the World - Complete Works  (2010)

References

20th-century Brazilian mathematicians
1916 births
20th-century Brazilian philosophers
Brazilian logicians
Schelling scholars
1963 deaths
Heidegger scholars
Mythographers
Brazilian modern pagans
Road incident deaths in Brazil
Modern pagan philosophers